The Seguin Bruins were a Junior "A" ice hockey team from the greater Parry Sound area, created in 2005. The Bruins were based in the village of Humphrey, in Seguin Township, Ontario, Canada.  They were a part of the Central Canadian Hockey League. In 2010 they accepted a buyout from their league to cease operations.

History
After the Parry Sound Shamrocks became defunct in 2002, the Bruins were created in 2005 to be the new Junior "A" ice hockey team in Parry Sound.

The Bruins were below .500 in their first season, however they were able to make the playoffs where they lost in the conference quarter final to the eventual conference champion Stouffville Spirit.

The first game ever played with this team was an exhibition game against the North Bay Sky Hawks and the first goal was scored by Jason Tsang, who played that season with the Parry Sound Midget Shamrocks under coach Rick Thomas and Tim McWhirter where he was a defenseman and made his first All-Star appearance in Bracebridge. Seguin's first regular season game took place at home on September 11, 2005 against the Couchiching Terriers.  The game ended up being a 6-5 loss for the Bruins. The first goal in regular season came halfway through the first period on a powerplay scored by Gerald Bojanowki.  Thomas Speer was the goaltender in the Bruins' first game.  The Bruins' first win came on October 2, 2005 as a 5-0 shutout against the Collingwood Blues.  Jonathan Porretta picked up both the franchise's first win and shutout in net stopping all 33 shots.

Season-by-season results

External links
Bruins Webpage

Ontario Provincial Junior A Hockey League teams